Ants Eskola (until 1935 Erhard-Voldemar Esperk; 17 February 1908 in Tallinn – 14 December 1989 in Tallinn) was a Soviet and Estonian actor, singer and artist. He appeared in 25 films from 1930 to 1979. People's Artist of the USSR (1964). His younger brother was actor Olev Eskola.

References

External links

 Estmusic.com On this website it's possible to listen to various Estonian singers from 1930s, including Ants Eskola.

1908 births
1989 deaths
Male actors from Tallinn
Singers from Tallinn
People from Kreis Harrien
Estonian male film actors
20th-century Estonian male singers
Soviet male actors
Estonian Academy of Arts alumni
Gulag detainees
People's Artists of the USSR
People's Artists of the Estonian Soviet Socialist Republic
Recipients of the Order of the Red Banner of Labour
Burials at Metsakalmistu